Canadian Freestyle Ski Association is the governing federation for freestyle skiing in Canada.

The Association was established in 1975, and there are now well over 50 freestyle ski clubs across the country.

External links

Freestyle Skiing BC

See also
 Canadian Snowboard Federation, Canadian snowboard sports federation
 Nordic Combined Ski Canada, Canadian Nordic combined skiing sports federation
 Ski Jumping Canada, Canadian ski jumping sports federation
 Cross Country Canada, Canadian cross country skiing sports federation
 Alpine Canada, Canadian alpine skiing sports federation
 Biathlon Canada, Canadian biathlon ski-shooting sports federation

Ski
Freestyle skiing in Canada
Freestyle skiing organizations